Charles Nott may refer to:
 Charles Nott (coach), head coach of the California Golden Bears college football team
 Charles C. Nott (1827–1916), Chief Justice of the United States Court of Claims
 Charles Cooper Nott, Jr. (1869–1957), Assistant District Attorney and Judge of the New York General Sessions Court
 Charles Stanley Nott (1887–1978), writer and mystic